The first season of the American horror series Chucky, created by Don Mancini, premiered on Syfy and USA Network on October 12, 2021 and concluded on November 30, 2021. The season consists of 8 episodes. The series is based on the Child's Play film franchise.

The series serves as a sequel to Cult of Chucky, and stars Brad Dourif reprising his role as the voice of the titular character, alongside Zackary Arthur, Teo Briones, Alyvia Alyn Lind, and Björgvin Arnarson. The season received generally positive reviews from critics, resulting in a renewal for a second season in November 2021.

Cast and characters

Main 
 Zackary Arthur as Jake Wheeler
 Björgvin Arnarson as Devon Evans
 Alyvia Alyn Lind as Lexy Cross
 Teo Briones as Junior Wheeler
 Brad Dourif as the voice of Chucky / Charles Lee Ray
 Jacob Breedon as Chucky (double)
 David Kohlsmith as young Charles Lee Ray (7 years old)
 Tyler Barish as young Charles Lee Ray (14 years old)
 Fiona Dourif as Charles Lee Ray in the 1980s and present (non-speaking)

Recurring 

 Devon Sawa as Logan Wheeler
 Sawa also portrays Lucas Wheeler
 Lexa Doig as Bree Wheeler
 Barbara Alyn Woods as Mayor Michelle Cross
 Michael Therriault as Nathan Cross
 Rachelle Casseus as Detective Kim Evans
 Carina London Battrick as Caroline Cross
 Fiona Dourif as Nica Pierce
 Jennifer Tilly as Tiffany Valentine
 Blaise Crocker as young Tiffany Valentine
Tilly also voices her doll form that originated in Bride of Chucky.
 Christine Elise as Kyle
 Alex Vincent as Andy Barclay
 Annie M. Briggs as Miss Fairchild
 Rosemary Dunsmore as Dr. Amanda Mixter

Episodes

Promotion and broadcast 

The first season of Chucky premiered simultaneously on Syfy and the USA Network on October 12, 2021. Prior to the premiere, both channels released several promotional posters and videos, including one where Chucky reenacts the trailer for the 1978 film Magic with his classic voodoo chant to Damballa. In June, Syfy presented the "Pride of Chucky" marathon, consisting of six of the seven films from Child's Play franchise, in celebration of the LGBTQ+ pride month. On October 8, Don Mancini, Zackary Arthur, Jennifer Tilly and Alex Vincent attended the New York Comic Con, where a "Good Guys" branded ice cream truck was displayed. A screening of the first episode was also held at the same event.

Reception

Critical response

On Rotten Tomatoes, the first season holds an approval rating of 91% based on 31 critic reviews, with an average rating of 6.9/10. The website's critical consensus reads, "A bloody good time that benefits greatly from Brad Dourif's return, Chucky may not play well for non-fans, but franchise devotees will find its absurd humor and creative horror very much intact on the small screen." Metacritic gave the series a weighted average score of 70 out of 100 based on 10 critic reviews, indicating "generally favorable reviews".

Ratings

Syfy

USA Network

References 

2021 American television seasons